Frederick Irving (May 2, 1921 – November 13, 2016) was an American diplomat and civil servant. He was United States Ambassador to Iceland from 1972 to 1976, Assistant Secretary of State for Oceans and International Environmental and Scientific Affairs from 1976 to 1977, and United States Ambassador to Jamaica from 1977 to 1978.

Biography

Frederick Irving was born in Providence, Rhode Island, on May 2, 1921.  He studied at Classical High School, where he met his future wife, Dorothy.  He was educated at Brown University, receiving an A.B. in political science in 1943.

After graduating from Brown, Irving served in the United States Army Air Corps for the remainder of World War II as a navigator.  On his 37th bombing mission, his B-24 Liberator heavy bomber was shot down over Hungary as he was returning from bombing the Blechhammer oil refinery.  He spent the remainder of the war as a prisoner of war at Stalag Luft III.

After the war, he attended Fletcher School of Law and Diplomacy at Tufts University and received an M.A. in international relations.  He then studied at the National War College.

Irving then joined the United States Foreign Service and worked there for 32 years.  In September 1972, President of the United States Richard Nixon nominated Irving to be United States Ambassador to Iceland.  He served there until 1976.  In 1976, President Gerald Ford nominated Irving as Assistant Secretary of State for Oceans and International Environmental and Scientific Affairs and he held this position until 1977.  President Jimmy Carter then named him United States Ambassador to Jamaica.

Irving retired in 1978, and died on November 13, 2016.

Bibliography

References

1921 births
2016 deaths
20th-century American diplomats
20th-century Unitarians
21st-century American people
Ambassadors of the United States to Iceland
Ambassadors of the United States to Jamaica
American autobiographers
American expatriates in Austria
American expatriates in Iceland
American expatriates in Jamaica
American expatriates in New Zealand
Jewish American military personnel
American people of Moldovan-Jewish descent
American people of Russian-Jewish descent
American prisoners of war in World War II
American Unitarians
American Unitarian Universalists
Brown University alumni
Burials at Arlington National Cemetery
Carter administration personnel
Converts to Unitarianism from Judaism
Deaths from cancer in Massachusetts
Ford administration personnel
Harvard Kennedy School faculty
National War College alumni
Nixon administration personnel
People from Amherst, Massachusetts
People from Providence, Rhode Island
Prisoners of war held by Germany
The Fletcher School at Tufts University alumni
United States Army Air Forces personnel of World War II
United States Assistant Secretaries of State
United States Foreign Service personnel
Economists from Massachusetts
Economists from Rhode Island
United States Army Air Forces officers
Classical High School alumni